The Polikarpov I-6 was a Soviet biplane fighter prototype of the late 1920s. It was designed with traditional wooden construction in comparison with the wood and steel tube construction Polikarpov I-5. Its development took longer than planned and the lead designer, Nikolai Polikarpov, was arrested for industrial sabotage, which only further delayed the project. Only two prototypes were built, as the I-5 was selected for production.

Design and development
Development of the I-6 (Istrebitel—fighter) began in September 1928 with a deadline for delivery for the first prototype of 1 August 1929 after the first prototypes of the Polikarpov I-3 were completed. Although the new fighter shared many of the characteristics of the earlier design, including the staggered sesquiplane, single-bay, layout of the wings, it was a new design which used a nine-cylinder, single-row, air-cooled Bristol Jupiter radial engine rather the water-cooled inline engine of its predecessor. It was designed by the OSS (—Landplane Department), later redesignated as OPO-1 (—Experimental Department) of Aviatrest ("Aviation Trust") under the supervision of Nikolai Polikarpov, head designer of the department. It was originally intended to be compared to the I-3, but this was changed to an evaluation of construction methods with the wooden construction I-6 compared to the mixed construction Polikarpov I-5. Both aircraft used the Jupiter VI engine for which a license had recently been negotiated.

The I-6 had an oval-section semi-monocoque fuselage covered with 'shpon', molded birch plywood, with a small headrest faired into the fuselage, although the engine was enclosed in a metal cowling that left the cylinder heads exposed for better cooling. The two-spar wings were covered in plywood and fabric and had a Clark Y profile. Internal bracing wires were fitted to reinforce the wings. The control surfaces were framed in duralumin, but covered in fabric. The duralumin N-type struts that separated the wings, and attached the upper wing to the fuselage, had a teardrop profile. They were reinforced with steel bracing wires. The conventional undercarriage was fixed with rubber shock absorbers. The wooden propeller was given a spinner. The lighter weight of the air-cooled Jupiter engine, which required neither a heavy radiator nor coolant, meant that the I-6 had an empty weight only 62% of that of the I-3.

Polikarpov was arrested and imprisoned by the OGPU in September 1929 for the crime of industrial sabotage when neither the I-6 nor the I-5 projects met their stipulated deadlines, and this delayed the first flight of the I-6 until 30 March 1930. The second prototype was completed shortly thereafter and both aircraft appeared in that year's May Day fly-past over Moscow. Both aircraft likely used imported engines before they were replaced by the Soviet-built copy of the Jupiter, the Shvetsov M-22. One I-6 crashed on 13 June 1930 after the test pilot bailed out, without justification, in the opinion of the Soviet aviation historian Vadim B. Shavrov.

The I-5 and the I-6 were virtually identical in performance, although the I-6 took 15 seconds to complete a full circle versus the 9.5 seconds of the I-5. Both aircraft were armed with two 7.62 mm (0.3 in) PV-1 machine guns, but the production model of the I-5 was expected to be armed with four, although this proved to impose too great a penalty to the I-5's performance. The exact reasons for the selection of the I-5 over the I-6, which was debated for a full year, are not known, but likely relate to both of these factors. Curiously, Polikarpov was not informed of the selection of the I-5 until his release in 1933 after his initial sentence of death had been commuted to ten years of imprisonment in a labor camp.

Specifications

See also

References

Bibliography

 
 
 

1930s Soviet fighter aircraft
I-006
Sesquiplanes
Single-engined tractor aircraft
Aircraft first flown in 1930